The Native Tongues were a collective of late 1980s and early 1990s hip-hop artists known for their positive-minded, good-natured Afrocentric lyrics, and for pioneering the use of eclectic sampling and jazz-influenced beats.  Its principal members were the Jungle Brothers, De La Soul, and A Tribe Called Quest. The collective was also closely tied to the Universal Zulu Nation. Rolling Stone cites the track "Doin' Our Own Dang" as "the definitive Native Tongues posse cut".

Naming

The Native Tongues took their name from a line in the song “African Cry,” by Motown-offshoot funk group New Birth, which features the lyric, “took away our native tongues."

History

The New York City-based Native Tongues crew was a collective of like-minded hip hop artists who would help bring abstract and open-minded lyricism that addressed a range of topics—from spirituality and modern living to race, sex, and just having fun—to the mainstream. Together with the use of eclectic samples that would take on an increasingly jazzy sound, they would be pioneers of so-called conscious hip hop, alternative hip hop, and jazz rap.

De La Soul's Trugoy the Dove recalled: "The Native Tongues came about where, basically, we had a show together in Boston. [De La Soul], Jungle [Brothers] and we linked from there. We had a natural love for the art and a natural love for each other on how we put stuff together. So we invited [the Jungle Brothers] to a session, and when they hooked up with us, we happened to be doing "Buddy." It wasn't business; it wasn't for a check. It was just trading ideas and just seeing what you're doing. Bottom line, it was just having fun."

According to Q-Tip of A Tribe Called Quest: "I remember Afrika [Baby Bam] called me that night, like, two in the morning. "Yo these kids, De La Soul, you gotta meet ’em! I swear we're just alike!" I went there, met them, and it was just fuckin' love at first sight. It was disgusting. In hip hop, it praises individualism. I think that's the main achievement of the Native Tongues. It just showed people could come together."

Fostered by Kool DJ Red Alert, the success of the Jungle Brothers would pave the way for De La Soul and A Tribe Called Quest; together, these three groups would form the core of the crew and continue the spirit of Afrika Bambaataa and the Zulu Nation. By 1989 they had been joined by Queen Latifah and the United Kingdom's Monie Love, and soon by the Black Sheep & Chi-Ali. Collectively, the members of the Native Tongues had a huge effect on the style and trends of hip hop during its most important period, the golden age of the late 1980s–early 1990s. A Tribe Called Quest and De La Soul's albums of this time are considered among the best and most important in the hip hop genre.

The song "Scenario" was the final track on A Tribe Called Quest's album The Low End Theory and featured the fledgling Leaders of the New School—Dinco D, Busta Rhymes, and Charlie Brown.

While featuring an extensive discography, the collaborations of the Native Tongues have been fairly limited: the collective never recorded anything under that name, and the number of notable crew cuts can be counted on one hand. The various groups grew distant with time, and, by 1993, De La Soul's Trugoy the Dove proclaimed, "That native shit is dead." The collective would, however, reunite in 1996 for the Jungle Brothers’ "How Ya Want It We Got It (Native Tongues Remix)"; collaborators in this period, such as Common, The Roots, Truth Enola, DJ S.T.R.E.S.S., Da Bush Babees, and Mos Def, could be seen as latter-day additions to the crew.  In 1998 on A Tribe Called Quest's album The Love Movement, the last track ("Rock Rock Ya'll") features Jane Doe, Mos Def, Punchline & Wordsworth. Q Tip states near the track's end that "this right here is a family".

Legacy

The Native Tongues are credited with expanding the hip-hop genre, inspiring and enabling the future success of artists such as Kanye West, The Neptunes (Pharrell Williams & Chad Hugo) and Tyler, The Creator. In 2019, the 9:30 Club in Washington, D.C. launched an annual Native Tongues Festival to celebrate the musical legacy of the Native Tongues. 

There are several collectives today—with overlapping membership—that can be seen as the spiritual heirs to the Native Tongues crew: the Spitkicker crew (founded by De La Soul's Trugoy and Posdnuos in 2000), the Okayplayers, and the Soulquarians. Chris Lighty was a member of the Native Tongues-affiliated street crew the Violators and began his career carrying records for Zulu Nation DJs, and later as the Jungle Brothers' roadie. Until his death in 2012 he ran the successful Violator Management company, which represented Busta Rhymes and Q-Tip, among other high-profile clients.

Members

Core members 
Jungle Brothers (Mike Gee, Sammy B, Afrika Baby Bam)
A Tribe Called Quest (Q-Tip, Phife Dawg, Ali Shaheed Muhammad and Jarobi White)
De La Soul (Posdnuos, Trugoy, and Maseo)
Lucien Revolucien
Monie Love
Queen Latifah
Black Sheep (Dres and Mista Lawnge)
Chi-Ali
Fu-Schnickens† (Chip Fu, Moc Fu and Poc Fu)

Peripheral members

The Beatnuts (Psycho Les, JuJu and Fashion)
Brand Nubian (Grand Puba, Sadat X, Lord Jamar, DJ Alamo & DJ Sincere)
Shortie No Mass†
Prince Paul
J Dilla (as a member of The Ummah with Q-Tip and Ali Shaheed Muhammad)
Leaders of the New School (Busta Rhymes, Charlie Brown, Dinco D, Milo)
Mos Def†
Truth Enola†
DJ S.T.R.E.S.S.
Da Bush Babees (Lord Khaliyl, Lee Majors and Light)
Common
The Pharcyde†† (Imani, Bootie Brown, Slimkid3 and Fatlip)
Vinia Mojica

† According to De La Soul interview on MuchMusic's RapCity in 1996.

†† According to Q-Tip interview the BBC Radio 1 special The Story Of Q-Tip.

 According to Dres of Blacksheep, Dj CaveM Moetavation ( Known for Eco Hiphop )

Collaborations
Collaborations involving the original members, those that could be considered true Native Tongues crew cuts, are in bold. Note that this list is incomplete.

1988
 "Black is Black" by Jungle Brothers feat. Q-Tip, from Straight out the Jungle
 "The Promo" by Jungle Brothers feat. Q-Tip, from Straight out the Jungle

1989
 "Buddy" by De La Soul featuring Jungle Brothers and Q-Tip from A Tribe Called Quest, from 3 Feet High and Rising
 "Description" De La Soul featuring Q-Tip and Prince Paul, from 3 Feet High and Rising
 "Buddy (Native Tongues Decision)" by De La Soul featuring Jungle Brothers, A Tribe Called Quest, Monie Love, and Queen Latifah, from "Buddy" 12-inch single
 "The Mack Daddy on the Left" by De La Soul from "Say No Go" 12-inch single
 "Acknowledge Your Own History" by Jungle Brothers featuring Vinia Mojica, from Done by the Forces of Nature
 "Done by the Forces of Nature" by Jungle Brothers feat. Jungle DJ Towa Toha, from Done by the Forces of Nature
 "Doin' Our Own Dang" by Jungle Brothers feat. De La Soul, Queen Latifah, Q-Tip and Monie Love, from Done by the Forces of Nature
 "Mama Gave Birth to the Soul Children" by Queen Latifah featuring De La Soul, from All Hail the Queen
 "Ladies First" by Queen Latifah featuring Monie Love, from All Hail The Queen

1990
 "Swiney Swiney" by Monie Love featuring De La Soul, from Down to Earth
 "Pubic Enemy" by A Tribe Called Quest feat. DJ Red Alert, from People's Instinctive Travels and the Paths of Rhythm
 "Luck of Lucien" by A Tribe Called Quest feat. Lucien Revolucien, from People's Instinctive Travels and the Paths of Rhythm

1991
 "Verses From The Abstract" by A Tribe Called Quest featuring Vinia Mojica, from The Low End Theory
 "Scenario" by A Tribe Called Quest featuring Leaders of the New School, from The Low End Theory
 (The Original Version of Scenario featured De La Soul and Black Sheep as well as Leaders of the New School)
 "Show Business" by A Tribe Called Quest featuring Brand Nubian and Diamond D, from The Low End Theory
 "Come on Down" by Big Daddy Kane feat. Q-Tip and Busta Rhymes, from Prince of Darkness
 "La Menage" by Black Sheep featuring Q-Tip, from A Wolf in Sheep's Clothing
 "Pass The 40" by Black Sheep featuring Chi Ali, Jim Jones, Chris Lighty, and Dave Gossett, from A Wolf in Sheep's Clothing
 "A Roller Skating Jam Named "Saturdays"" by De La Soul featuring Q-Tip and Vinia Mojica, from De La Soul is Dead
 "Fanatic Of The B Word" by De La Soul featuring Dres and Mike G, from De La Soul is Dead
 "What Yo Life Can Truly Be" by De La Soul featuring A Tribe Called Quest (Including Jarobi) and Black Sheep, available on the "A Roller Skating Jam Named Saturdays" vinyl single.

1992
 "Scenario (Remix)" by A Tribe Called Quest feat. Kid Hood and Leaders Of The New School, from "Scenario" 12" single
 "Let The Horns Blow" by Chi Ali feat. Dres, Dove, Fashion and Phife Dawg, from The Fabulous Chi-Ali
 "La Schmoove" by The Fu-Schnickens feat Phife Dawg, from "F.U. "Dont Take It Personal""
 "Check It Out" by the Fu-Schnickens feat Dres, from "F.U. "Dont Take It Personal""

1993
 "Award Tour" by A Tribe Called Quest featuring Trugoy, from Midnight Marauders
 "Oh My God" by A Tribe Called Quest featuring Busta Rhymes, from Midnight Marauders
 "One-Two Shit" by A Tribe Called Quest featuring Busta Rhymes, from "Oh My God" 12-inch single
 "Roll wit tha Flava" by The Flavor Unit MCs feat. Treach, Chip-Fu, Freddie Foxxx, Queen Latifah, Heavy D, D-Nice, and Dres, from Roll Wit Tha Flavor
 "En Focus" by De La Soul featuring Shorty No Mass, and Dres, from Buhloone Mind State
 "I Am I Be" by De La Soul featuring Busta Rhymes, Chip Fu, Dres, Fred Wesley, Maceo Parker, Melvin Parker, Pee Wee Ellis, and Rodney Jones, from Buhloone Mind State

1994
 "We Run Things(It's Like Dat)" da Bush Babees (Ali Shaheed Muhammad production) from Ambushed
 "Sh. Fe. MC's" by De La Soul featuring A Tribe Called Quest, from Clear Lake Auditorium EP

1996
 "Ill Vibe" by Busta Rhymes featuring Q-Tip, from The Coming
 "3 MC's" by da Bush Babees featuring Q-Tip, from Gravity
 "S.O.S." by da Bush Babees featuring Mos Def, from Gravity
 "Love Song" by da Bush Babees featuring Mos Def (prod. by Posdnous), from Gravity
 "Big-Brother Beat" by De La Soul featuring Mos Def, from Stakes Is High
 "Pony Ride" by De La Soul featuring Truth Enola from Stakes Is High
 "Stakes is High (Remix)" De La Soul featuring Truth Enola and Mos Def, from "Itzsoweezee (HOT)" 12-inch single
 "Love Song remix" Bush Babees featuring De La Soul and Mos Def
 "Flashlight (Remix)" by George Clinton featuring Q-Tip, Busta Rhymes & Ol' Dirty Bastard, from Greatest Funkin' Hits
 "Out For The Cash (Remix)" by DJ Honda feat. Fat Joe, the Beatnuts, and Common
 "How Ya Want It We Got It (Native Tongues Remix)" by Jungle Brothers featuring Q-Tip and De La Soul, from Raw Deluxe

1997
 "Wild Hot" by A Tribe Called Quest & Busta Rhymes, from Rhyme & Reason Soundtrack
 "Rumble in the Jungle" by The Fugees featuring John Forté, A Tribe Called Quest, and Busta Rhymes, from When We Were Kings Soundtrack
 "Fortified Live" by Reflection Eternal featuring Mos Def & Mr. Man
Hear Iz... - a mixtape by DJ S.T.R.E.S.S. featuring Q-Tip, Sadat X, The Beatnuts, Wyclef Jean, and Prince Paul

1998
 "Steppin' It Up" by A Tribe Called Quest featuring Busta Rhymes and Redman, from The Love Movement
 "Rock Rock, Y'all" by A Tribe Called Quest featuring Punch, Jane Doe, Words, and Mos Def, from The Love Movement
 "K.O.S. (Determination)" by Black Star featuring Vinia Mojica, from Mos Def & Talib Kweli are Black Star
 "Body Rock" by Mos Def, Tash & Q-Tip, from Lyricist Lounge, Volume One 
 "Respiration" by Black Star featuring Common, from Mos Def & Talib Kweli are Black Star
"Twice Inna Lifetime" by Black Star featuring Jane Doe, Wordsworth, and Punchline, from Mos Def & Talib Kweli are Black Star
Intercommunal Compositions - a mixtape by DJ S.T.R.E.S.S. featuring Mos Def, A Tribe Called Quest, Consequence, Talib Kweli, and The Roots

1999
 "Do it Now" by Mos Def featuring Busta Rhymes, produced by Mr Khaliyl(Mr. Man) from Black On Both Sides
 "Know That" by Mos Def featuring Talib Kweli, from Black On Both Sides
 "Climb" by Mos Def featuring Vinia Mojica, from Black On Both Sides
 "Mr. Nigga" by Mos Def featuring Q-Tip, from Black On Both Sides
 "Got" by Mos Def produced by Ali Shaheed Muhammad, from Black On Both Sides
 "The Truth" by Pharoahe Monch featuring Common and Talib Kweli, from Internal Affairs
 "It's Going Down" by Dres featuring Chi-Ali and Droop Dog, from Sure Shot Redemption
 "Bang" by Maseo featuring Truth Enola, DCQ, Mike G (of the Jungle Brothers) and Indeed,
 "Tinseltown to Boogiedown" by Scritt-Polliti featuring Lee Majors(of da Bush Babees) and Mos Def 
 "Slam Pit" by the Beatnuts featuring Common and Cuban Link, from A Musical Massacre
 "Vivrant Thang (Remix)" by Q-Tip featuring Busta Rhymes & Missy Elliott
 "N.T." by Q-Tip featuring Busta Rhymes, from Amplified
 "Voicetress" by Truth Enola featuring De La Soul from Blind Side Recordings presents Wide Angels

2000
 "Set the Mood" - De La Soul featuring Indeed, produced by Mr. Khaliyl(of Bush Babees) from Art Official Intelligence: Mosaic Thump
 "I.C. Y'All" by De La Soul featuring Busta Rhymes, from Art Official Intelligence: Mosaic Thump
 "What's That? (¿Que Eso?)" by Tony Touch featuring Mos Def and De La Soul, from The Piece Maker
 "The Questions" by Common featuring Mos Def & Monie Love, from Like Water for Chocolate
 "One for Love Part 1" by Mos Def, Talib Kweli, Posdnuos, Pharoahe Monch, Kool G Rap, Rah Digga, Sporty Thievz, and Shabaam Sahdeeq, from Hip-Hop for Respect

2001
 "Take That" by Da Beatminerz featuring Flipmode Squad & Vinia Mojica, from Brace 4 Impak
 "Wages of Sin"-Mr. Khaliyl featuring Talib Kweli

2002
 "Get By (Remix)" by Talib Kweli featuring Mos Def, Busta Rhymes, Jay-Z, and Kanye West
 "Stand To The Side" by Talib Kweli featuring Vinia Mojica & Res, from Quality

2003
 "Let's Get Loud" by Steven Tyler, Busta Rhymes, Phife Dawg, MC Lyte, and Chuck D, from the 2003 ESPY Awards

2004
 "Get 'Em High" by Kanye West featuring Talib Kweli and Common from The College Dropout.
 "She Wants to Move (Native Tongues Remix)" by N*E*R*D feat. Common, Mos Def, De La Soul, and Q-Tip, from "She Wants To Move Remixes" 12-inch single
 "Days of Our Lives" by De La Soul featuring Common, from The Grind Date
 "Lord Can I Have This Mercy" - (featuring Chip-Fu) from Ali Shaheed Muhammad's [i]Shaheedulah & Stereotypes[/i]

2005
 "Like That" by The Black Eyed Peas featuring Cee-Lo Green, Talib Kweli, Q-Tip, and John Legend, from Monkey Business
 "We Can Make it Better" by Kanye West featuring Rhymefest, Q-Tip, Common, and Talib Kweli

2006
 "Get You Some" by Busta Rhymes featuring Q-Tip and Marsha Ambrosius, from The Big Bang
 "You Can't Hold A Torch" by Busta Rhymes featuring Q-Tip and Chauncey Black, from The Big Bang

2007
 "Where Are They Now? (Remix)" by Nas featuring Mike G, Dres, Das EFX, Positive K, EST, DoItAll, Chip Fu, Monie Love, Father MC, Spinderella, Rob Base, and Redhead Kingpin

2010
 "Birds of a Feather" by Black Sheep featuring Q-Tip from A Tribe Called Quest, Trugoy the Dove of De La Soul, and Mike Gee of the Jungle Brothers. From Black Sheep album "From the Black Pool of Genius" due June 29, 2010.
 "Scheming" by Slum Village ft. J Dilla, Posdnuos of De La Soul, and Phife Dawg from Villa Manifesto

2011
"P.T.I. (Occupy Wall Street)" by evitaN (Dres of Black Sheep and Jarobi of A Tribe Called Quest)

2012
"Rock Together" by Black Sheep Featuring Q-Tip of A Tribe Called Quest, Dave of De La Soul, and Mike G of the Jungle Brothers

References

Further reading 
 
"They Made Magic" at Tangents.co.uk
"Consequence Q & A at HipHopDX, June 30th 2010" at HipHopDX.com

External links
 
 

Hip hop collectives
East Coast hip hop groups